Funky Dory is the solo debut album by English singer Rachel Stevens. It was released by Polydor Records on 29 September 2003 in the United Kingdom. The album was produced by various record producers, including Bloodshy & Avant and Richard X. Funky Dory received a positive reception from music critics who complimented its surprising diversity, charm and relative depth. It became Stevens' most successful album release, and reached number nine in the United Kingdom, where it was certified gold. On 16 July 2004 the album was re-issued in the United Kingdom, including three new songs, and reached number thirteen on the UK Albums Chart.

Critical reception

The Observer critic Peter Robinson called Funky Dory "an excellent album. It's stylish, decadent and temperamental, and it's teeming with melodrama: like a Geri Halliwell album, but not crap. And there's a total absence of desperation. While Halliwell's first album was about killing off Ginger, Stevens is not lumbered with any such task since, despite having spent half a decade as one of pop's biggest names, Rachel had no personality [...] Twelve-year-olds will rightly believe they're too old for S Club 8, but they won't be very impressed with the taut New Jill Swing of "I Got the Money", while the steely "Silk" (Erotica-era Madonna with Britney's "I'm a Slave 4 U" verse melody and a sudden, magnificent James Bond flourish in the middle eight) is cool and sassy but a massive Hi-NRG overhaul away from prompting a "Reach"-style amyl nitrate moment down at G-A-Y."

Chart performance
Funky Dory debuted and peaked at number nine on the UK Albums Chart. The album was certified silver by the British Phonographic Industry (BPI) after three days and reached gold status on 10 October 2003. It descended from the top-seventy-five after six weeks. The albums re-issue debuted at number thirteen on the UK Albums Chart in 2004, selling 14,600 copies in its first week, becoming the hundred and eightieth best-selling album of 2004 in the UK. Together, both editions have sold over 110,000 copies in the UK.

Track listing

Notes
 denotes remixer
 denotes additional producer

Charts

Weekly charts

Year-end charts

Certifications

Release history

References

2003 debut albums
2003 albums
Rachel Stevens albums
Albums produced by Stephen Lipson
Albums produced by Bloodshy & Avant
Albums produced by Mike Peden
19 Recordings albums
Polydor Records albums